Layng is both a given name and a surname. 

Notable people with the given name include:
Layng Martine Jr., American songwriter

Notable people with the surname include:
Kathryn Layng (born 1960), American actress
Mabel Frances Layng (1881–1937), British landscape and figure painter
Thomas Layng (1892-1958), British Anglican soldier and clergyman